Hjørring East railway halt is a railway halt located in the eastern part of the city of Hjørring in Vendsyssel, Denmark. The halt serves the area's many educational institutions as well as the nearby hospital.

The halt is located on the Vendsyssel Line from Aalborg to Frederikshavn, between Hjørring station and Sindal station. It opened in 2021. The train services are operated by the railway company Nordjyske Jernbaner which runs frequent regional train services to Aalborg and Frederikshavn.

See also
 List of railway stations in Denmark

References

External links
 Banedanmark – government agency responsible for maintenance and traffic control of most of the Danish railway network
 Nordjyske Jernbaner – Danish railway company operating in North Jutland Region
 Danske Jernbaner – website with information on railway history in Denmark
 Nordjyllands Jernbaner – website with information on railway history in North Jutland

Railway stations in the North Jutland Region
Railway stations in Denmark opened in 2021